The 1974 Tour de Romandie was the 28th edition of the Tour de Romandie cycle race and was held from 7 May to 12 May 1974. The race started in Geneva and finished in Grand-Lancy. The race was won by Joop Zoetemelk.

General classification

References

1974
Tour de Romandie
Tour de Romandie
1974 Super Prestige Pernod